The year 1904 in architecture involved some significant architectural events and new buildings.

Events

 May – The Ford Motor Company approves construction of the Ford Piquette Avenue Plant, a New England mill-style building in Detroit, Michigan, USA.
 June – Construction work begins on the New York Hippodrome, designed by Frederic Thompson and Jay H. Morgan (demolished 1939).

Buildings and structures

Buildings opened
 January 8 – Blackstone Library, Chicago, designed by Solon Spencer Beman.
 Spring – Old Faithful Inn in Yellowstone National Park, Wyoming, designed by Robert Reamer.
 April – Watts Gallery in Compton, Guildford, England, designed by Christopher Hatton Turnor.
 May 3 – Midtgulen Church, in Bremanger Municipality, Norway, designed by Lars Sølvberg, is consecrated by Bishop Johan Willoch Erichsen.
 September 4 – St. Regis Hotel in New York City, designed by Trowbridge & Livingston with interiors by Arnold Constable.
 September 17 – New St Columba Church of Scotland, Glasgow, designed by Tennant and Burke.

Buildings completed

 The Rhode Island State House in Providence, Rhode Island, designed by McKim, Mead & White, completed.
 Kaiser-Friedrich-Museum, Berlin, designed by Ernst von Ihne.
 Batumi Synagogue, Georgia, designed by Semyon Vulkovich.
 The Bergeret House in Nancy, France, by Lucien Weissenburger, with ironwork by Louis Majorelle, interior paintings by Victor Prouvé, stained glass by Jacques Gruber and woodwork by Eugène Vallin.
 The Villa des Roches, designed by Émile André as his own house, in the Parc de Saurupt in Nancy, France.
 Larkin Administration Building, designed by Frank Lloyd Wright for the Larkin Soap Company of Buffalo, New York.
 The Mayoralty of Baku, final work of Józef Gosławski.
 Hungarian Parliament Building (Országház) on the Danube in Budapest, designed by Imre Steindl (died 1902).
 Hammersmith Hospital, London, designed by Giles, Gough and Trollope.
 Rue Franklin Apartments, Paris, by Auguste Perret and his brother Gustave, an early example of an exposed reinforced concrete frame building.
 Hôtel Brion, Strasbourg, built by architect Auguste Brion for himself.

Awards
 RIBA Royal Gold Medal – Auguste Choisy.
 Grand Prix de Rome, architecture: Ernest Michel Hébrard.

Births
 February 25 – Sydney Ancher, Australian architect (died 1979)
 March 3 – Donald McMorran, English neo-Georgian architect (died 1965)
 April 18 – Giuseppe Terragni, Italian Rationalist architect (died 1943)
 June 8 – Bruce Goff, American residential architect (died 1982)
 September 11 – Paul Thiry, American architect (died 1993)
 September 29 – Egon Eiermann, German architect (died 1970)
 November 25 – John Summerson, English architectural historian (died 1992)
 December 29 – Hans van der Laan, Dutch monk and architect (died 1991)

Deaths
 March – Peter Paul Pugin, English architect (born 1851)
 October 4 – Frédéric Bartholdi, French sculptor, designer of the Statue of Liberty (born 1834)

References